Julie Halard-Decugis was the defending champion but did not compete that year.

Martina Hingis won in the final 6–3, 3–6, 6–3 against Anke Huber.

Seeds
A champion seed is indicated in bold text while text in italics indicates the round in which that seed was eliminated. The top four seeds received a bye to the second round.

  Martina Hingis (champion)
  Jana Novotná (semifinals)
  Anke Huber (final)
  Iva Majoli (semifinals)
  Irina Spîrlea (quarterfinals)
  Karina Habšudová (second round)
  Brenda Schultz-McCarthy (second round)
  Mary Pierce (quarterfinals)

Draw

Final

Section 1

Section 2

External links
 1997 Open Gaz de France Draw

Open GDF Suez
1997 WTA Tour